Vietotrechus minutissimus is a species of beetles in the family Carabidae, the only species in the genus Vietotrechus.

References

Trechinae
Monotypic Carabidae genera